The 1976 Jackson State Tigers football team represented the Jackson State University during the 1976 NCAA Division II football season as a member of the Southwestern Athletic Conference (SWAC). The Tigers were led by fifth-year head coach Robert Hill for the first seven games of the season, before he was fired and replaced by W. C. Gorden. Jackson State compiled an overall record of 5–4 with a mark of 3–3 in conference play, tying for fourth place in the SWAC.

Schedule

References

Jackson State
Jackson State Tigers football seasons
Jackson State Tigers football